Druskininkai is a spa town on the Nemunas River in southern Lithuania, close to the borders of Belarus and Poland. The city of Druskininkai has a population of 12,055 and dates back as a spa resort to the 19th century.

Geography

The town is located at the Ratnyčia River estuary to the Nemunas River and is surrounded by a natural forest reserve. The town is situated in a picturesque landscape with rivers, lakes, hills and forests.

History
According to some sources the site of present-day Druskininkai was inhabited by local Yotvingian tribes in the early Middle Ages. In the 13th century the area became a part of the expanding Duchy of Lithuania. A small castle was built in the area as a part of the defence system against the Teutonic Order. In 1308 the castle was conquered by the Teutonic Knights and destroyed, causing a depopulation of the area. In 1569, the area of ​​Druskininkai came under Polish influence.

The first written mention of  Druskininkai dates back to 1636. The name of the town suggests that the local population collected minerals such as salt. In the late 18th century it was believed that minerals found in the waters of Druskininkai area produced health benefits and their usage in the medical treatment of asthma and other ailments began. In the early 19th century Ignacy Fonberger, a professor at the University of Vilnius, analyzed the chemical composition of Druskininkai's waters and showed that they contain large amounts of Calcium, Sodium, Potassium, Iodine, Bromine, Iron and Magnesium. He also promoted the town as a holiday resort for the population of Vilnius. In the eighteenth century, the town was eagerly visited by Polish kings who treated their health ailments.

After the Third Partition of Poland in 1795, Druskininkai became part of the Russian Empire (Russian partition of Poland)

In 1837 Tsar Nicholas I of Russia bestowed upon Druskininkai the status of a spa, and construction of pensions and hostels started. To ease communication to the spa, a ferry service on the Nemunas was started.
The spa became popular in many parts of the former Polish–Lithuanian Commonwealth. In 1862 the Warsaw – Saint Petersburg Railway was opened and Druskininkai's railway station was placed only  from the city.

In June 1887, a Jewish national conference was held in Druskininkai led by Leon Pinsker and Moses Lilienblum which discussed ideas that played an important role in the development of the Zionist movement.

By the beginning of the 20th century the Druskininkai spa was one of the most popular resorts in the area and a place of summer residence for the middle class of Vilnius, Warsaw and Moscow.

After World War I the town became part of Poland. Its popularity was increased by the patronage of Józef Piłsudski, who spent most of his summer holidays there and promoted the development of the area. Soon most of the resort was bought up by the state-owned Bank Gospodarstwa Krajowego and the construction of luxurious villas and pensions started. According to the first Polish census of 1921, Druskininkai was inhabited by 989 people, among whom 646 were Roman Catholic, 46 Orthodox, 3 Evangelical and 294 Jewish. At the same time, 700 inhabitants declared Polish nationality, 8 Belarusian, 242 Jewish, 20 Russian and only 19 Lithuanian. There were 308 residential buildings here. In 1934 a railway link with the  train station was opened and the town became more accessible to the general public. It was a gmina center in Grodno powiat of Białystok Voivodeship.

After Poland was invaded in September 1939, the town was briefly incorporated into the Byelorussian SSR as raion center in Belastok Region. However, on 7 September 1940, Stalin transferred Druskininkai to Lithuania which in turn was annexed in August of that year and incorporated into the Soviet Union. It was occupied by Nazi Germany on 23 June 1941 and was part of Bezirk Bialystok. At this period, and as part of the "Final Solution" plan of the Nazis, the Jewish community of the town was wiped out. Some of the Jews were sent to ghettos in near-by Kaunas, and the remainder murdered by the Nazis. 
It was taken again by Red Army on 14 July 1944 and passed to Lithuanian SSR. In 1951, Druskininkai began to grow rapidly again and several huge sanatoriums and spa hospitals were opened. The city became a famous resort, attracting around 400,000 visitors per year from all over the Soviet Union.

Landmarks and culture

Despite damage inflicted during  World War I, the city features houses and villas reflecting all periods of its development - Russian, Polish and Lithuanian.

The first water park in Lithuania was opened in Druskininkai on 26 December 2006.

The Snow Arena (construction completed in August 2011) is one of the biggest indoor skiing slopes in Europe, with a year-round indoor slope length of 460 metres, width up to 63 metres, and a height difference of 65.65 metres. In addition there is a seasonal outdoor route of 640 metres. In alpine ski complex Snow Arena works school of skiing and snowboarding DruSkiSchool.
There are a number of art and historical museums and galleries in the city. Many cultural events take place, most of them during spring, summer and fall.

During 1896–1910, famous Lithuanian composer and painter Mikalojus Konstantinas Čiurlionis lived and worked in the city. A number of regular events take place at his memorial museum each year.

An annual poetry event, "Druskininkai poetic fall", began in 1985 and attracts authors from all over the world. In 2001, Grūtas park was opened near Druskininkai, exposing sculptures and other materials of the Soviet era.

There is also an annual International Arts Festival 'Druskininkų vasara su M.K.Čiurlioniu' (eng. The summer in Druskininkai with Mikalojus Konstantinas Čiurlionis).

Twin towns — sister cities

Druskininkai is twinned with:

 Augustów, Poland
 Elbląg, Poland
 Dzerzhinsk, Russia
 Grodno, Belarus
 Kolpino, Russia
 Strzelce Opolskie, Poland

Notable residents
 Shmaryahu Yitzchak Bloch (ca. 1862-1923), rabbi
 The father of American actor Charles Bronson (1921-2003), Valteris P. Bučinskis, was born in Druskininkai
 Mikalojus Konstantinas Čiurlionis (1875-1911), lived here
 Jan Czeczot (1796-1847), poet and ethnographer, died here
 Jacques Lipchitz (1891-1973), Lithuanian Jewish sculptor, was born here
 Antanas Sniečkus (1902-1974), first secretary of the Lithuanian Communist Party died here
 Marian Turski (born 1926), journalist and historian

References

External links 

Druskininkai homepage
Druskininkai municipality 
Wolf golf club
Grūtas park
M. K. Čiurlionis museum
Druskininkai Aqua Park
Druskininkai on Litauen Netz
Article on things to do in Druskininkai

 
Spa towns in Lithuania
Cities in Alytus County
Cities in Lithuania
Grodnensky Uyezd
Białystok Voivodeship (1919–1939)
Belastok Region
Municipalities administrative centres of Lithuania
Ski areas and resorts in Lithuania